Kazuhiro "Daimajin"  Sasaki (佐々木 主浩 Sasaki Kazuhiro, born February 22, 1968) is a former Nippon Professional Baseball and Major League Baseball right-handed relief pitcher. He played his entire NPB career with the Yokohama Taiyo Whales / Yokohama BayStars (1990–1999; 2004–2005). Sasaki played his entire MLB career with the Seattle Mariners (2000–2003).

Professional career
After playing college baseball for Tohoku Fukushi University, Sasaki was drafted in the first round of the 1989 draft by the Yokohama Taiyō Whales (now named Yokohama DeNA BayStars) in Japan's Central League. He played for them from 1990–1999, before joining the Seattle Mariners in 2000. He joined a bullpen that had been one of the worst in the Major Leagues, and during his rookie year won the closer job from a floundering José Mesa. Sasaki's out pitch, a devastating split-fingered fastball that drops when arriving at home plate, was nicknamed "The Thang" by Mariners radio announcers. He complemented it with a four-seam fastball that topped out at mid-90s. Sasaki maintained a rigorous throwing program, sometimes at odds with club management, that saw him throw up to 100 pitches following games in which he did not appear.

Sasaki's transition to American baseball began with his being named American League Rookie of the Year. For three years, along with Jeff Nelson and Arthur Rhodes, Sasaki was an integral member of the back of Seattle's bullpen. He decided to leave the Mariners before the last year of his contract in 2004, giving up $8.5 million, citing his desire to be with his family in Japan. According to the Seattle Post-Intelligencer, however, Sasaki's real reason for returning to Japan was pressure from ownership, due to his "indiscreet philandering".

Sasaki resumed his career with the BayStars upon returning to Japan, where he pitched for another year. But in his second year back, nagging knee and elbow injuries resulted in his release from Yokohama and subsequent retirement. His last official appearance came as a cameo against the Tokyo Giants on August 9, 2005, as he struck out his longtime friend and rival Kazuhiro Kiyohara in a game played at Fullcast Stadium Miyagi in his hometown.

In addition to his Rookie of the Year award, Sasaki set several Japanese professional baseball records, including saves (45) and save opportunities (46) for a single season in 1998; he was twice selected to play in the All-Star game, and was selected to eight All-Star teams in Japan. Sasaki's 37 saves in his rookie season with the Seattle Mariners remained a Major League Baseball record for saves by a rookie until Neftalí Feliz broke it in 2010 with 40.

Personal life
In 1991, Sasaki married former idol singer Kaori Shimizu. Together they had two children.

After returning to Japan in 2005, Sasaki continued his affair with actress Kanako Enomoto, who was 13 years his junior. When Enomoto became pregnant, Shimizu divorced Sasaki on March 18, 2005. Enomoto gave birth prematurely on April 29, 2005.

Sasaki's interest in sports extends outside baseball. In 2002 and 2003, he lent his name to a team in Formula Nippon, an auto racing series in Japan. His Team 22 won two races in that time. He is currently the general representative of D'Station Racing in the Super GT series.

Notable horses Sasaki has owned include Verxina, named by Enomoto, who won the Victoria Mile twice,  Vivlos, winner of the 2017 Dubai Turf race on Dubai World Cup Night, and Cheval Grand, winner of the 2017 Japan Cup. 

Sasaki has appeared as a judge on the Iron Chef television program. He had a side recording career, with an album of his vocals over techno beats.

Sasaki chose 22 for his uniform number because he was born at 2:22 on February 22 (2/22). The BayStars have permanently honored his number.

See also
 List of Major League Baseball single-inning strikeout leaders

References

External links

1968 births
American League All-Stars
Everett AquaSox players
Inland Empire 66ers of San Bernardino players
Japanese expatriate baseball players in the United States
Japanese racehorse owners and breeders
Japanese Baseball Hall of Fame inductees
Living people
Major League Baseball pitchers
Major League Baseball players from Japan
Major League Baseball Rookie of the Year Award winners
Nippon Professional Baseball pitchers
Seattle Mariners players
Baseball people from Sendai
Tacoma Rainiers players
Yokohama BayStars players
Yokohama Taiyō Whales players